The Sichuan Giant Panda Sanctuaries located in southwest Sichuan province of China, is the home to more than 30% of the world's giant pandas and is among the most important sites for the captive breeding of these pandas. It covers 9245 km2 with seven nature reserves and nine scenic parks in the Qionglai and Jiajin Mountains. Along with the giant panda, the sanctuary is a refuge to other endangered species such as the red panda, the snow leopard, and the clouded leopard. Outside of the tropical rainforests, it is among the botanically richest sites of  the world, and is home to between 5,000 and 6,000 species of flora. It has been noted that the region is similar to the paleo-tropic forests of the Paleogene and Neogene Periods. Because of its biodiversity and conservation of giant pandas, these sanctuaries were listed as UNESCO World Heritage Sites in 2006.

The Sichuan Giant Panda Sanctuaries consist of seven nature reserves and nine scenic parks.
 Seven Nature Reserves
 Wolong Nature Reserve
 Fengtongzhai Nature Reserve
 Mount Siguniang Nature Reserve
 Laba River Nature Reserve
 Anzihe Nature Reserve
 Heishui River Nature Reserve
 Jintang-Kongyu Nature Reserve
 Caopo Nature Reserve
 Nine Scenic Parks
 Mt. Qingcheng-Dujiangyan Scenic Park
 Mt. Tiantai Scenic Park
 Mt. Siguniang Scenic Park
 Xiling Snow Mountain Scenic Park
 Mt. Jiguan-Jiulonggou Scenic Park
 Mt. Jiajin Scenic Park
 Miyaluo Scenic Park
 Mt. Lingzhen-Mt. Daxue Scenic Park
 Mt. Erlang Scenic Park

Gallery

References

External links
 UNESCO description of the site
 Wolong Panda Club
 Pandas !

Protected areas of China
World Heritage Sites in China
Wildlife sanctuaries of Asia
Nature reserves of Sichuan
Tourist attractions in Sichuan